Coke Studio is a Pakistani television programme and international music franchise which features studio-recorded music performances by established and emerging artists. It is the longest-running annual television music show in Pakistan, running annually since 2008. 

Coke Studio combines a myriad of musical influences, from traditional classical, folk, Sufi, qawwali, ghazal and bhangra music to contemporary hip hop, rock and pop music. The show is noted for promoting Pakistan's multiculturalism by inviting artists from various regions and of various languages to collaborate musically.

History
The concept for the show was created in 2007 by Nadeem Zaman of The Coca-Cola Company, when musical performances were held on a concert-like platform in Brazil. In 2008, the concept was adopted by Nadeem Zaman, then Marketing Head The Coca-Cola Company in partnership with former Vital Signs member Rohail Hyatt, who planned to launch a Pakistani version of the show. The inaugural season premiered in June in front of a live audience. The show was produced by him, along with his wife Umber Hyatt and Nofil Naqvi a Pakistani cinematographer. It was an immediate success, receiving critical acclaim and frequently being rebroadcast on numerous television and radio stations in the country. In season 2, live audiences were excluded and performances were held in a closed studio platform, a format which continues to this day. Hyatt remained as executive producers for the show until season 6, stepping aside in 2013 after five years. He was replaced by Strings members Bilal Maqsood and Faisal Kapadia until on 29 October 2017, when Strings announced season 10 would be their last production. On 8 March 2018, it was announced that Ali Hamza and Zohaib Kazi will be producing season 11. They stepped down after producing the season. Later on, Rohail Hyatt returned for the twelfth season of the show which released on 11 October 2019. Hyatt drove it to 13th season, after which, on his recommendation, Xulfi spearheaded the 14th season with Abdullah Siddiqui as the associate producer; Hyatt giving up the lead once again.

On the tenth anniversary of the show in 2017, the General Manager of Coca-Cola Pakistan & Afghanistan, Rizwan U. Khan, stated, "We have come a long way since we embarked on this challenging journey a decade ago. Looking back, we feel greatly humbled that Coke Studio has been able to achieve so much, in terms of bringing virtually unknown or little known musicians into the national limelight, re-introducing music genres like qawwali and sufi music to the youth of Pakistan, continuing to stay true to the promise of producing quality fusion of music and practically playing an important role in reviving the music industry of Pakistan."

Format

The show features artists in each episode, by a house band and guest artists. Coke Studio tracks are officially available on their YouTube and SoundCloud channels.

The music which is recorded live by artists at Coke Studio. The televisual style is characterized by frequent closeups on various performers, emphasizing the collective contributions of the entire ensemble, even as primary focus remains on the lead singer, or singers.

Musically, the format features an always changing and fascinating mix of Western instruments (primarily guitars, pianos, synthesizers, bass guitars, and drum kits) with traditional instruments from the Indian subcontinent (harmonium, rubab, sarod, sitar, bamboo flutes, dholak, tabla, and other traditional percussion instruments). With rare exceptions, the singer is the lead instrumentalist. Other instrumental solos, while often highly virtuosic, tend to be relatively brief.

Coke Studio Explorer

The producers Ali Hamza and Zohaib Kazi introduced Coke Studio Explorer in which they went to several places across Pakistan to discover regional music stories and singers to bring them to the lime light. The series was released on 3 July 2018.

Seasons overview

Featured artists 
Below is a list of artists who have performed in Coke Studio.

Season 1 (2008)

Ali Azmat
Ali Zafar
Maira Iftikhar
Mauj
Ustad Hussain Baksh Gullo
Rahat Fateh Ali Khan
Sain Tufail
Sajid & Zeeshan
Strings

Season 2 (2009)

 Ali Zafar
 Arieb Azhar
 Atif Aslam
 Chae Dong Mi
 Javed Bashir
 Josh
 Noori
 Riaz Ali Khan
 Saieen Zahoor
 Shafqat Amanat Ali Khan
 Strings
 Zeb and Haniya

Season 3 (2010)

Abida Parveen
Amanat Ali
Arieb Azhar
Arif Lohar
Aunty Disco Project
Entity Paradigm
Fakir Juman Shah
Karavan
Meesha Shafi
Noori
Rizwan-Muazzam
Sanam Marvi
Tina Sani
Zeb and Haniya

Season 4 (2011)

 Akhtar Chanal Zahri
 Asif Hussain Samraat
 Attaullah Khan Esakhelvi
 Bilal Khan
 Fareed Ayaz & Abu Mohammad
 Jal
 Kaavish
 Komal Rizvi
 Mizraab
 Mole
 Qurat-ul-Ain Balouch
 Sajjad Ali
 Sanam Marvi
 Akhtar Chanal Zahri
 The Sketches
 Ustaad Naseer-ud-din Saami

Season 5 (2012)

Atif Aslam
Bilal Khan
Bohemia
Chakwal Group
Fareed Ayaz & Abu Mohammad
Farhan Rais Khan
Hadiqa Kiani
Hamayoon Khan
Meesha Shafi
Tahir Mithu
Overload
Qayaas
Rachel Viccaji
SYMT
Sanam Marvi
Uzair Jaswal

Season 6 (2013)

 Abrar-ul-Haq
 Alamgir
 Ali Azmat
 Asad Abbas
 Atif Aslam
 Ayesha Omer
 Fariha Pervez
 Muazzam Ali Khan
 Rostam Mirlashari
 Rustam Fateh Ali Khan
 Saieen Zahoor
 Sanam Marvi
 Sumru Ağıryürüyen
 Umair Jaswal
 Zara Madani
 Zeb & Haniya
 Zoe Viccaji

Season 7 (2014)

 Abbas Ali Khan
 Abida Parveen
 Abrar-ul-Haq
 Akhtar Chanal Zahri
 Asrar
 Fariha Pervez
 Humaira Channa
Aisha Zafar
 Javed Bashir
 Jawad Ahmed
 Komal Rizvi
 Meesha Shafi
 Rahma Ali
 Rahat Fateh Ali Khan
 Sajjad Ali
 Ustad Rais Khan
 Zohaib Hassan
 Zoe Viccaji
 Ustad Tafu
 Jimmy Khan
 Usman Riaz
 Momin Durrani
 Naseer & Shahab
 Niazi Brothers
 Sara Haider

Season 8 (2015)

  Ali Azmat 
  Ali Haider 
  Ali Sethi 
  Ali Zafar 
  Alycia Dias 
  Arif Lohar 
  Atif Aslam  
  Ustad Hamid Ali Khan 
  Qurat-ul-Ain Balouch 
  Sara Raza Khan 
  Shazia Manzoor  
  Rizwan & Muazzam 
  Farida Khanum 
  Mekaal Hasan Band (Mekaal Hasan, Gino Banks, Sheldon D'Silva, Sharmistha Chatterjee) 
  Nabeel Shaukat Ali 
  Gul Panra 
  Surriya Khanum 
  Umair Jaswal 
  Karam AbbasViccaji
  Mai Dhai  
  Fizza Javed 
  Asim Azhar
  Mulazim Hussain 
  Kavish (Jaffer Zaidi and Maaz Maudood) 
  Malang Party (Zeeshan Mansoor, Ibrahim, Zain Ali) 
  Bakshi Brothers (Aafi Bakhshi, Yawar Bakshi, Bilal Bakshi and Sherry Bakshi) 
  Nafees Ahmed 
  Samra Khan 
  Sara Haider 
  Siege (Junaid Younus, Muhammad Ahsan & Parvaiz) 
  Shehroze Hussan (sitarist)
  Haider Ali (haidertonight)

Season 9 (2016)

 Abida Parveen
 Ahmed Jahanzeb
 Ali Azmat 
 Ali Khan 
 Ali Sethi 
 Amjad Sabri
 Asim Azhar 
 Basit Ali
 Damia Farooq
 Faakhir Mehmood
 Haroon Shahid
 Jabar Abbas
 Jaffer Zaidi
 Javed Bashir 
 Junaid Khan
 Kashif Ali
 Masuma Anwar
 Meesha Shafi
 Mehwish Hayat 
 Mohsin Abbas Haider
 Momina Mustehsan
 Naeem Abbas Rufi 
 Naseebo Lal 
 Natasha Khan
 Nirmal Roy
 Noor Zehra
 Noori 
 Qurat-ul-Ain Balouch
 Rachel Viccaji
 Rafaqat Ali Khan
 Rahat Fateh Ali Khan 
 Rizwan Butt
 Saieen Zahoor
 Sanam Marvi 
 Sara Haider 
 Shahzad Nawaz
 Shani Arshad 
 Shilpa Rao 
 Shiraz Uppal
 Shuja Haider
 Umair Jaswal 
 Zebunnisa Bangash

Season 10 (2017)

Ali Sethi
Aima Baig
Danyal Zafar
Aisha Zafar
Rahat Fateh Ali Khan
Abrar-ul-Haq
Hania Khawar
Ali Zafar
Ayesha Omar
Atif Aslam
Bohemia
Bilal Saeed
Meesha Shafi
Mehwish Hayat
Jabar Abbas
Momina Mustehsan
Waqar Ehsin
Attaullah Khan Esakhelvi
Sanwal Khan Esakhelvi
Qurat-ul-Ain Balouch
Sahir Ali Bagga
Asim Azhar
Uzair Jaswal
Hina Nasrullah
Ali Hamza
Nabeel Shaukat Ali
Faraz Anwar
Faiza Mujahid
Ahmed Jahanzeb
Zaw Ali
Sajjad Ali
Waqar Ali
Jawad Ahmed
Shiraz Uppal
Nirmal Roy
Umair Jaswal
Farhan Saeed
Akbar Ali
Rachel Viccaji
Shuja Haider
Jaffer Zaidi
Humaira Channa
Mekaal Hasan
Salman Ahmad
Shani Arshad
Arieb Azhar
Ali Noor
Irteassh
Humera Arshad
Kaavish
Amanat Ali
Natasha Khan
Javed Bashir
Shafqat Amanat Ali Khan
Strings

Explorer 2018

 Ariana and Amrina: Both Amrina and Ariana, whose birth name was Farsi Gul and who changed it to her current name after American singer Ariana Grande are members of the Kalash community residing in Bumburet Valley of Chitral. Both have been singing together locally since the age of five.
 Shamu Bai and Vishnu: This brother and sister duo were classically trained by their father Arjun and hail from Deewan Lal Chand a village in rural Sindh. They are famous for their bhajans at local jagrans and have also performed at local gatherings, weddings and festivals.
 Mangal Khan, Darehan Khan Maula Baksh and Shayan Maula Baksh: Known as "Baloch Throat Musicians", Mangal Khan together with Darehan and Shyan hails from Dera Bugti District in Balochistan. One of few singers who have been performing using throat singing technique called "overtone singing" (in Balochi known as "Nar-sur") for over thirty-years. Kazi compared their music to Tuvan singing of Mongolian monks.
 Mishal Khawaja: Born in Pakistan and raised in Toronto, Mishal Khawaja hails from Lahore. Mishal begin her career with covers and released her first original single digitally in 2015 titled "Murder" which was then followed by "Do You Feel it" and "Vertigo". She was discovered by Kazi and Hamza, after they saw her work on Instagram. On her singing Kazi said, "she has a unique, refreshing take on urban music and sings with a lot of passion."
 Qasamir: Band of four musicians led by Altaf Mir with Ghulam Mohammad Daar, Manzoor Ahmed Khan, Saifuddin Shah hails from Muzaffarabad. Mir is a master craftsman and together with Ghulam Muhammad has worked for Radio Pakistan for forty-years, while Manzoor is a rickshaw driver and Saifuddin is a professional chef. Together they known form a band Qasamir (to resonate with Kashmir).

Season 11 (2018)

 Ali Sethi
 Humaira Arshad
 Gul Panrra
 Rachel Viccaji
 Asim Azhar
 Asrar
 Abrar-ul-Haq
 Aima Baig
 Abida Parveen
 Shuja Haider
 Sahir Ali Bagga
 Momina Mustehsan
 Ali Azmat
 Attaullah Khan Esakhelvi
 Sanwal Esakhelvi
 Hassan Jahangir
 Young Desi (Mufassir)
 Lucky & Naghma
 Haniya Aslam
 Ahad Raza Mir
 Natasha Baig
 Zarsanga
 Sounds of Kolachi
 Chand Tara Orchestra 
 Mughal-e-Funk
 The Sketches
 Khumariyaan
 Jimmy Khan
 Lyari Underground (L.U.G)
 Fareed Ayaz and co.
 Krewella
 Ariana & Amrina
 Mishal Khawaja
 Mangal, Darehan & Shayan
 Shami Bai & Vishnu
 Riaz Qadri & Ghulam Qadri
 Bilal Khan
 Jawad Ahmad
 Elizabeth Rai

Season 12 (2019)

 Abrar-ul-Haq
 Aima Baig
 Ali Sethi
 Atif Aslam
 Banur's Band
 Barkat Jamal Fakir Troupe
 Fareed Ayaz and Abu Muhammad
 Fariha Pervez
 Hadiqa Kiani
 Harsakhiyan
 Kashif Din
 Nimra Rafiq
 Qurat-ul-Ain Balouch
 Rachel Viccaji
 Rahat Fateh Ali Khan
 Sahir Ali Bagga
 Sanam Marvi
 Shahab Hussain
 Shamali Afghan
 Shuja Haider
 Umair Jaswal
 Zeb Bangash
 Zoe Viccaji

Season 13 (2020) 

 Aizaz Sohail
 Ali Noor
 Ali Pervaiz Mehdi
 Bohemia
 Fariha Pervez
 Meesha Shafi
 Mehdi Maloof
 Rahat Fateh Ali Khan
 Sanam Marvi
 Sehar Gul Khan
 Umair Jaswal
 Wajeeha Naqvi
 Zara Madani

Season 14 (2022) 

 Abdullah Siddiqui
 Abida Parveen
 Ali Sethi
 Ameer Baksh
 Arooj Aftab
 Asfar Hussain
 Atif Aslam
 Butt Brothers
 Eva B
 Faisal Kapadia
 Faris Shafi
 Hasan Raheem
 Justin Bibis
 Kaifi Khalil
 Karakoram
 Lahore Jazz Ensemble
 Meesha Shafi
 Momina Mustehsan
 Naseebo Lal
 Qurat-ul-Ain Balouch
 Anushae Gill
 Soch
 Talal Qureshi
 Talha Anjum (Young Stunners)
 Wahab Bugti
 Young Stunners
 Zain Zohaib Qawwals

Reception
Following success in Pakistan after its first launch, Coke Studio has become an international franchise. The Pakistani show has amassed a large fan base in neighbouring country, India. The success of the show prompted Coca-Cola to launch the Indian version Coke Studio @ MTV, with a similar format, which has proven to be both critically acclaimed and commercially successful. The Indian version has been produced by MTV India. In April 2012, an Arab version of the show, Coke Studio بالعربي was launched in the Middle East featuring performances by various Arabic and international music artists, produced by the songwriter Michel Elefteriades. Following the success of the Pakistani and Indian version, The Bangladeshi installment Coke Studio Bangla was launched on 7 February 2022.

Coke Studio has also been seen as an economic process of transnationalism and as a transnational television production, with its production systems being created and augmented by global flows of artists, technology, distribution and economics. Within this process, economic structures are created, opened and even reoriented; influences are borrowed and music produced; communities and heritage discovered and remained – this is done intellectually and physically, and more importantly, transnationally.

On 1 November 2017, Atif Aslam's rendition of Sabri Brothers' qawwali "Tajdar-e-Haram" in Coke Studio Season 8 crossed 100 million views on YouTube, becoming the first video originating in Pakistan to achieve the landmark record. It has been viewed in 186 countries across the world. Later, Rahat Fateh Ali Khan's rendition of "Afreen Afreen" featuring Momina Mustehsan, on 3 November, became the second video of Pakistani origin to mark 100 million on YouTube. It was released on 19 August 2016, with Faakhir who served as music directed for it; it was originally performed by Nusrat Fateh Ali Khan. In season 14 2022, "Pasoori" by Ali Sethi and Shae Gill crossed 313 million views on YouTube and has gone viral in India. As of July 2022, these three videos have surpassed 972+ million views.

See also
Coke Studio Bangla
Nescafé Basement
MTV Unplugged
Coke Studio India
Acoustic Station

Notes

References

External links

 
2000s Pakistani television series
2008 Pakistani television series debuts
Pakistani music television series
Pakistani television series based on non-Pakistani television series